José Luis "Jesse" González Gudiño (born May 25, 1995) is an American professional soccer player who plays as a goalkeeper.

Early life
González was born in North Carolina. He grew up in Texas and played for a local Dallas team named C.D. Independiente under head coach Jose Antonio Radilla.

Club career
González was recruited by FC Dallas at the age of 16 and started in the academy; he was signed to a professional contract a few years later. On March 25, 2013, he signed a Homegrown Player (HGP) contract with the club, making him the 10th homegrown signing in club history.

González was loaned to United Soccer League club Pittsburgh Riverhounds in August 2015. He then became a starter for FC Dallas towards the end of the 2015 season, starting the club's final 11 regular-season matches of 2015 as well as four playoff matches. After being benched for most of 2016, Gonzalez emerged as FC Dallas' starting goalkeeper for the 2017 MLS season, ranking among the best in the league in both goals against average and in save percentage.

On June 6, 2020, González was suspended by MLS following alleged domestic abuse allegations. On August 7, 2020, González and Dallas mutually agreed to terminate his contract.

International career
González was eligible to play for Mexico or the United States, having been born and raised in the US to Mexican parents. He played for Mexico national youth teams, including as the Mexico under-20 starting goalkeeper at the 2015 CONCACAF U-20 Championship and the 2015 FIFA U-20 World Cup.

In December 2015, it was reported that González was planning to join the United States men's national soccer team for their January 2016 training camp. It was later reported that he had changed his mind and was named as part of the Mexico under-23 preliminary roster for the 2016 Olympics.

On June 3, 2017, González was named by Bruce Arena to the United States' 40-man preliminary roster for the 2017 Gold Cup. On June 29, U.S. Soccer confirmed that González's one-time switch had been approved by FIFA, and moving forward he would represent the United States at the international level. On July 16, González was added to the United States' 23-man roster for the Gold Cup knockout stage.

Honors 
FC Dallas
US Open Cup: 2016
Supporters' Shield: 2016

Mexico U20
CONCACAF U-20 Championship: 2015

United States
CONCACAF Gold Cup: 2017

References

External links

1995 births
Living people
American soccer players
Mexican footballers
FC Dallas players
Pittsburgh Riverhounds SC players
American sportspeople of Mexican descent
Association football goalkeepers
Soccer players from North Carolina
Major League Soccer players
USL Championship players
Mexico youth international footballers
Mexico under-20 international footballers
2017 CONCACAF Gold Cup players
CONCACAF Gold Cup-winning players
2015 CONCACAF U-20 Championship players
People from Edenton, North Carolina
Homegrown Players (MLS)